Ziraat Bankası is a state-owned bank in Turkey founded in 1863. Offers commercial loan support to companies and tradesmen, as well as personal loans such as consumer loans, vehicle loans and housing loans.

History

During the first half of the 19th century, with the adoption of western models of trade and finance, foreign banks began their activities in the Ottoman Empire. At that period, there was not enough capital to found a national banking system and no one could mention the existence of national banks as a source of capital. This situation was more harmful to farmers because they made up the majority of the population, and since they did not have any institutional financial structure to which to apply, they had to borrow money from the usurers with high interest rates. Under these conditions, the governor of Niš province of the Ottoman Empire, Midhat Pasha (1822–1884) began to take the first steps to overcome these difficulties in 1863 and achieved the reorganization of Memleket Sandığı (Homeland Funds), which became a law with Homeland Funds Regulations in 1867. Homeland Funds was the first agricultural financial institution founded by the state and operated with a state guarantee.

In 1888, Homeland Funds was renamed Ziraat Bankası, and Ziraat Bank's head office in Istanbul began to function. The Greco-Turkish War between 1919 and 1922 affected the bank's policy. The Greek liberation forces opened a Ziraat Bank Management Center in İzmir and occupied branches and funds were taken to the new Center's management. On the other hand, the Turkish Grand National Assembly charged the Ankara branch of Ziraat Bank with the management of branches and funds. With the Liberation of İzmir by Turkish forces on September 9, 1922, the İzmir organization was re-unified with the Ankara branch; and on October 23, the Istanbul organization too was re-unified with the Ankara branch. After the Turkish War of Independence ended in late 1923, Ziraat Bank became a united entity once again. Since the 1930s Ziraat played an important role in financing agricultural mechanisation in Turkey, which in the postwar period benefitted from support from the US Marshall Plan.

In 1993, Ziraat Bank Moscow, Kazakhstan Ziraat International Bank (KZI Bank), Turkmen Turkish Commercial Bank (TTC Bank), and Uzbekistan Turkish Bank (UT Bank) and in 2008 Ziraat Bank Greece were founded and started to operate. In 2001, Emlak Bankası wholly merged into Ziraat Bank.

See also

 List of banks in Turkey

References

External links
 Official Website

Further reading 
 

Banks established in 1863
Banks of Turkey
Companies listed on the Istanbul Stock Exchange
Companies based in Ankara
Turkish brands